Alter Tepliker was the sobriquet of Rabbi Moshe Yehoshua Bezhilianski ( 1919), a learned scholar and leading Breslover Hasid in Uman, Ukraine in the late 19th and early 20th centuries.

Biography 
Born in Teplik, Ukraine, he became active in the Breslover community in nearby Uman, where he married the sister of Abraham Chazan. Chazan's father, Nachman Chazan, was the closest disciple of Reb Noson, who was in turn the closest disciple of Rebbe Nachman of Breslov.

Breslover leaders of the following generation, such as Rabbis Shmuel Horowitz and Yitzchok Gelbach, attributed their initial interest in Breslov teachings to their first exposure to Alter Tepliker's Hishtafchut HaNefesh.

He fell victim to a Cossack pogrom during the Ukrainian struggle for independence in 1919. He was murdered in a synagogue while holding a sefer Torah.

Publications
Tepliker pioneered the publication of Breslover teachings on specific topics.
His ten books include:
 Hishtafchut HaNefesh (Outpouring of the Soul) — on the topic of hitbodedut (meditation)
 Meshivat Nefesh (Restore My Soul) — on the topic of inner strength
 Or Zorei'ach Haggadah (The Breslov Haggadah) — on the Passover Haggadah
 A commentary on Pirkey Avot
 Mei HaNachal (Waters of the River) — a commentary on Rebbe Nachman's Likutey Moharan.

References
Kramer, Chaim (1989). Crossing the Narrow Bridge. Breslov Research Institute. .

Breslov rabbis
Ukrainian Hasidic rabbis
Hasidic rabbis in Europe
19th-century rabbis from the Russian Empire
20th-century Russian rabbis
Jewish martyrs
1919 deaths
Anti-Jewish pogroms
Year of birth missing